Senator Carpenter may refer to:

B. Platt Carpenter (1837–1921), New York State Senate
Dennis Carpenter (1928–2003), California State Senate
Elisha Carpenter (1824–1897), Connecticut State Senate
Francis M. Carpenter (1834–1919), New York State Senate
J. L. Carpenter (1839–1919), Ohio State Senate
Jared Carpenter (born 1977), Kentucky State Senate
Matthew H. Carpenter (1824–1881), U.S. Senator from Wisconsin
Michael E. Carpenter (born 1947), Maine State Senate
Paul B. Carpenter (1928–2002), California State Senate
Robert C. Carpenter (1924–2011), North State Senate
Terry Carpenter (1900–1978), Nebraska State Senate
Tim Carpenter (born 1960), Wisconsin State Senate

See also
Senator Carpentier (disambiguation)